Glacier County Courthouse, a PWA Moderne-style courthouse at Cut Bank in Glacier County, Montana, was listed on the National Register of Historic Places in 2013.

It was built in 1938-1939 during an economic boom in Glacier County, while the Great Depression was going on in the rest of the nation, as the "Santa Rita Strip" provided oil boom jobs and optimism.

References

Courthouses on the National Register of Historic Places in Montana
PWA Moderne architecture in Montana
Government buildings completed in 1939
National Register of Historic Places in Glacier County, Montana
County courthouses in Montana
1939 establishments in Montana